A member of the United States Senate can resign by writing a letter of resignation to the governor of the state that the senator represents. Under Article I, Section 3 of the Constitution of the United States, and under the Seventeenth Amendment, in case of a vacancy in the Senate resulting from resignation, the executive authority of the state (today known in every state as the governor) can make a temporary appointment to fill the vacancy if so authorized by the state legislature. A special election may follow depending on timing and state law. Whenever a senator needs to be appointed or elected, the Secretary of the Senate mails one of three forms to the state's governor to inform them of the proper wording to certify the appointment of a new Senator.

The first resignation from the Senate was that of William Paterson of New Jersey on November 13, 1790, who resigned in order to accept the office of Governor of New Jersey. His resignation was only the third time a person ceased to hold a seat in the Senate, which had first convened during the preceding year, 1789. The earlier ones resulted from the death of Senator William Grayson of Virginia, and the expiration of the term of the temporary senator John Walker of Virginia, who was appointed by the Governor of Virginia to hold that office until a successor could be elected in November.

Before 1796, eight senators resigned. Nine senators resigned during that year—a record-high number that stands to this day. Most resignations have been motivated either by declining health or a decision to accept another office. Sixteen persons have resigned from the Senate twice and two have resigned three times.

1789 to 1799

1800 to 1849

1850 to 1899

1900 to 1949

1950 to 1999

2000 to present

References

Termination of employment
United States Senate